Huang Qixiang (2 September 1898 – 10 December 1970) was a Chinese military commander and statesman. He led the Chinese Action Committee for National Liberation in 1933 during the short-lived People's Revolutionary Government of the Republic of China.

Huang was a recipient of the Order of Blue Sky and White Sun.

References
北伐名将、抗日功臣黄琪翔 - 社会活动家、画家郭秀仪

National Revolutionary Army generals from Guangdong
People from Meixian District
1898 births
1970 deaths
People's Republic of China politicians from Guangdong
Victims of the Cultural Revolution
Recipients of the Order of Blue Sky and White Sun
Politicians from Meizhou
Chinese Peasants' and Workers' Democratic Party politicians
Victims of the Anti-Rightist Campaign